Hadia Bentaleb (born 31 August 1980) is an Algerian épée fencer. Bentaleb represented Algeria at the 2008 Summer Olympics in Beijing, where she competed in the women's individual épée event. She lost the preliminary round of thirty-two match to Hungary's Emese Szász, with a score of 4–15.

References

External links
Profile – FIE

Algerian female épée fencers
Living people
Olympic fencers of Algeria
Fencers at the 2008 Summer Olympics
1980 births
21st-century Algerian women